Norbert Holl is a German diplomat who served as Head of the United Nations special mission to Afghanistan from 1996 to 1997. He resigned from the position on December 29, 1997.

References

German diplomats
Living people
Year of birth missing (living people)
Special Envoys of the Secretary-General of the United Nations